Oussama Hsini (born 20 May 1993) is a Tunisian footballer who plays as a defender.

References

External links
 

1993 births
Living people
Tunisian footballers
Tunisian expatriate footballers
CS Sfaxien players
AS Gabès players
EGS Gafsa players
Olympique Béja players
Sfax Railways Sports players
Al-Selmiyah Club players
Kumait FC players
Tunisian Ligue Professionnelle 1 players
Saudi Second Division players
Expatriate footballers in Saudi Arabia
Tunisian expatriate sportspeople in Saudi Arabia
Association football defenders